Surinder Sandhu is a sarangi player and composer. He is a student of Sabri Khan of the Senia Rampur Moradabad gharana.

Sandhu composes in multiple genres. His compositions combine jazz, western classical and Asian fusion music. Guests performers on Sandhu's albums include rock guitarist Steve Vai to saxophonist Andy Sheppard. His album The Fictionist features the Royal Liverpool Philharmonic Orchestra, guest musicians, and The Surinder Sandhu Band. It was well received by critics after its release on September 29, 2008. The album includes a symphony commissioned to celebrate Liverpool as European Capital of Culture 2008.

Discography 
 Saurang Orchestra (2003)
 Cycles & Stories (2005)
 The Fictionist (2008)
 Karma Machine (2017)

References

External links
Official website

Hindustani instrumentalists
Indian male composers
Living people
Sarangi players
Year of birth missing (living people)